Hensley Township is one of nine townships in Johnson County, Indiana. As of the 2010 census, its population was 3,329 and it contained 1,341 housing units. Most of Trafalgar is in the northeast corner of the township.

Hensley Township was organized in 1827.

Geography

References

External links
 Indiana Township Association
 United Township Association of Indiana

Townships in Johnson County, Indiana
Townships in Indiana